Keza is a ward in Ngara District of the Kagera Region in west-central Tanzania. In 2016 the Tanzania National Bureau of Statistics report there were 10,810 people in the ward, from 9,525 in 2012.

Villages 
The ward has 15 villages.

 Keza
 Rukira
 Nyakabanda
 Kibirizi
 Rubanga I
 Kazingati
 Rubanga II

References

Populated places in Tanzania